Army Men: World War (Army Men: Operation Meltdown in Europe) is a third-person shooter (real-time tactics in the Microsoft Windows version) video game developed and published by The 3DO Company for PlayStation and Windows.

Reception

The PC version received mixed reviews, while the PlayStation version received unfavorable reviews, according to the review aggregation website GameRankings.

References

External links

2000 video games
Army Men
Multiplayer and single-player video games
PlayStation (console) games
Real-time strategy video games
Video games developed in the United States
Windows games